Delaware Township is a township in Polk County, in the U.S. state of Iowa.

History
Delaware Township was organized in 1850. It was named after Delaware, Delaware County, Ohio, the former home of an early settler.

References

Townships in Polk County, Iowa
Townships in Iowa
1850 establishments in Iowa
Populated places established in 1850